Giuseppe Dal Molin (born c. 1928) is an Italian curler.

At the international level, he is a  bronze medallist.

Teams

References

External links
 

Possibly living people
Italian male curlers

People from Cortina d'Ampezzo
1920s births
Place of birth missing (living people)
Sportspeople from the Province of Belluno